Colonel William Hicks, also known as Hicks Pasha, (18305 November 1883), British soldier, entered the Bombay Army in 1849, and served through the Indian mutiny, being mentioned in dispatches for good conduct at the action of Sitka Ghaut in 1859.

In 1861 he became captain, and in the Abyssinian expedition of 1867–1868 was a brigade major, being again mentioned in dispatches and given a brevet majority. He retired with the honorary rank of colonel in 1880.

He then entered the service of the Egyptian government, who controlled the Sudan.  He led the Egyptian army that was completely defeated in the Battle of Shaykan, in which he was killed and decapitated.

Service to the Khedive
After the close of the 1882 Anglo-Egyptian War, he entered the Khedive's service and was made a Pasha. In 1881, Sudan was controlled by Egypt; Muhammad Ahmad proclaimed himself Mahdi and began conquering neighboring territory and thus threatening the precarious Egyptian control of the territory. Early in 1883 Hicks went to Khartoum as chief of the staff of the army there, then commanded by Suliman Niazi Pasha. Camp was formed at Omdurman and a new force of some 8000 fighting men collected—mostly recruited from the fellahin of Arabi's disbanded troops, sent in chains from Egypt. After a month's vigorous drilling Hicks led 5000 of his men against an equal force of dervishes in Sennar, whom he defeated, and cleared the country between the towns of Sennar and Khartoum of rebels.

1883 expedition
Relieved of the fear of an immediate attack by the Mahdists, the Egyptian officials at Khartoum intrigued against Hicks, who in July tendered his resignation. This resulted in the dismissal of Suliman Niazi and the appointment of Hicks as commander-in-chief of an expeditionary force to Kordofan with orders to crush the Mahdi, who in January 1883 had captured El Obeid, the capital of that province. Hicks, aware of the worthlessness of his force for the purpose contemplated, stated his opinion that it would be best to "wait for Kordofan to settle itself" (telegram of 5 August).

The Egyptian ministry, however, did not then believe in the power of the Mahdi, and the expedition started from Khartoum on 9 September. It was made up of 7000 infantry, 1000 cavalry and 2000 camp followers and included thirteen Europeans. On the 10th the force left the Nile at Duem and struck inland across the almost waterless wastes of Kordofan for El Obeid. With the exception of some 300 men the whole force was killed. (See the Battle of El Obeid).

According to the story of Hicks's cook, one of the survivors, the general was the last officer to fall, pierced by the spear of the Khalifa Mahommed Sherif. After emptying his revolver the pasha kept his assailants at bay for some time with his sword, a body of Baggara who fled before him being known afterwards as "Baggar Hicks" (the cows driven by Hicks), a play on the words baggara and baggar, the former being the herdsmen and the latter the cows. Hicks's head was cut off and taken to the Mahdi.

Cultural depictions
Hicks was played by Edward Underdown in the 1966 film Khartoum.

Notes

References

Mahdiism and the Egyptian Sudan, book iv., by Francis Reginald Wingate (London, 1891)
With Hicks Pasha in the Soudan, by John Colborne (London, 1884).
The Road to Shaykan: Letters of General William Hicks Pasha written during the Sennar & Kordofan Campaigns, 1883. edited with an introduction and notes by M.W. Daly.  University of Durham 1983
Khartoum, the Ultimate Imperial Adventure by Michael Asher (London, 2005) 

1830 births
1883 deaths
British East India Company Army officers
British Indian Army officers
Pashas
British military personnel killed in the Mahdist War
British military personnel of the Abyssinian War
British military personnel of the Indian Rebellion of 1857
British people of the Mahdist War